Here to There is the second studio album by hip hop producer DJ Spinna. It is the eighth installment of BBE Beat Generation series, after releases by Pete Rock, J Dilla, DJ Jazzy Jeff, will.i.am and many others. It was released on February 3, 2003 on BBE Records. The album features appearances by various artists who sang, rapped or played musical instruments.

Track listing

Personnel

DJ Spinna – producer on all tracks, bass on "Alfonso's Thang", vocals on "Drive", scratching on "Galactic Soul", "All Up in It", "Rock (Unplugged)" and "Fly or Burn", tambourine on "Rock (Unplugged)"
Mark de Clive-Lowe – keyboards on "Surely", bass, keyboards and co-producer on "Love Is Sold" and "Music in Me (Come Alive)"
Eric "BLB" Coomes – bass on "Glad You're Mine" and "The Originator"
Godfrey Danchimah – vocals on "The Originator"
Shaun Escoffery – vocals on "Music in Me (Come Alive)"
Neal Evans – Hammond B-3 organ on "All Up in It"
Apani B. Fly – vocals on "Hold"
Jean Grae – vocals on "Hold"
Alfonso Greer – vocals on "Alfonso's Thang"
James Hurt – keyboards on "The Originator"
Angela Johnson – vocals, clavinet and bass on "Glad You're Mine"
Ronny Jordan – guitar on "Surely" and "Music in Me (Come Alive)"
Eric Krasno – guitar on "All Up in It"

Jason Kriveloff – bass on "Rock (Unplugged)"
Jordan McLean – trumpet on "The Originator"
Vinia Mojica – vocals on "Idols"
Ovasoul7 – vocals on "Surely"
Jay Rodriguez – flute, alto saxophone and baritone saxophone on "Rock (Unplugged)"
Selan – ARP string ensemble, bass and synthesizer on "Galactic Soul", keyboards on "Music in Me (Interlude)"
Mark Sherman – vibraphone on "Idols"
Abdul Shyllon – vocals on "Love Is Sold"
Mike T – percussion on "The Originator"
Kaidi Tatham – Moog Prodigy synthesizer on "Love Is Sold"
Mark Tewarson – guitar on "Rock (Unplugged)"
Ticklah – keyboards and co-producer on "Alfonso's Thang", organ and keyboards on "Idols", keyboards on "Surely"
Christian Urich – drums on "Rock (Unplugged)"

References

External links
 

2003 albums
DJ Spinna albums
Barely Breaking Even albums